Gwangjang Market, previously Dongdaemun Market, is a traditional street market in Jongno-gu, Seoul, South Korea. Approximately 65,000 people visit the market each day.

History 

The Gabo Reforms, which were introduced during the Joseon dynasty, eliminated the merchant monopolies that existed in Joseon at the time by allowing anyone to engage in commercial activities. The licensed merchants and shop owners in Seoul lost much of their business to competition as a result of these reforms, so King Gojong created a warehouse market called Changnaejang, which eventually developed into Namdaemun Market. After the signing of the Eulsa Treaty in 1905, when Korea was under Japanese colonial occupation, the Japanese took control of Namdaemun Market. In reaction to the seizure of Namdaemun Market, a group of private Korean investors, including wealthy merchants, decided to create a new market that was not under the control of the Japanese. They combined funds to create the Gwangjang Corporation on 5 July 1905, and purchased the land for the market with 100,000 Won. They used the pre-existing Bae O Gae Market, a morning market in the area, as the foundation for their new market, which they named Dongdaemun Market. At the time, most markets were temporary and open only occasionally, so Dongdaemun Market became the first permanent market to be open every day of the week. The market was renamed Gwangjang Market in 1960.

Name 
Gwangjang Market was originally the name of a single,  shopping center in the center of Dongdaemun Market, which was built between 1957 and 1959. The name comes from the two bridges it was built between: Gwangkyo (meaning "wide bridge") and Jangkyo (meaning "long bridge").

Products 

In the early years the market only sold agricultural and seafood products, but as it became one of the largest markets in Korea, it began to sell many other products. Today the market has approximately 1500–2000 vendors selling fruit, vegetables, meat, fish, bread, clothing, textiles, handicrafts, kitchenware, souvenirs, and Korean traditional medicinal items. There are also many restaurants and food stalls selling traditional Korean cuisine, but the market is most famous for its bindaetteok, or mung bean pancakes, and mayak gimbap.

Location 
The market is accessible from Jongno 5-ga or Euljiro 4-ga metro station.

In popular culture 
A 2014 episode of Running Man was partially filmed in the market. The cast stopped at various food stalls and had to choose the correct card after finishing their food to continue the race.
The premiere of The Amazing Race Australia 4 featured a 'Detour' task at the market in which teams that chose this task had to roll, fill, and fold 50 dumplings.
Gwangjang Market and its street foods (Kal-guksu, Gejang and Bindae-tteok) were featured on the Netflix TV series, Street Food (TV series) in the Seoul, South Korea episode.

Gallery

See also 
 Shopping in Seoul
 List of markets in South Korea
 List of South Korean tourist attractions

References

External links 

 Official website for Gwangjang Market 
 Official English tourism website for Gwangjang Market

1905 establishments in Korea
Buildings and structures in Jongno District
Food markets in South Korea
Retail markets in Seoul